Christopher M. Allport (born August 23, 1977) is an American filmmaker, actor, singer and symphonic composer. As a youth voice artist during the 1990s he received awards for his voice work in film and television and as a singer and actor.

Career
In his early career, Allport portrayed characters for Disney, Warner Brothers and Amblin Entertainment.  He was the voice of Tootles the Lost Boy, in Fox Children's Network Peter Pan and the Pirates, for which he received both a 1991 Young Artist Award nomination, and a 1992 Young Artist Award win. In Steven Spielberg's Hook, Allport dubbed the crowing sounds for Robin Williams when William's character begins flying and realizes that he really is Peter Pan.  In 1993, Allport provided additional voices for the movie Hocus Pocus, including re-voicing the role of the black cat, Binx.  Later on as an adult he played a pirate that was singing on the way to the gallows in the opening scene of Pirates of the Caribbean: At World's End, and he also appears on the movie soundtrack in the song "Hoist the Colors".

In 2000, Allport sang as a back-up singer to Barbra Streisand in her Timeless: Live in Concert Tour concert at Staples Center in Los Angeles.  That same year, he also served as a talent producer for the 2000 Democratic National Convention at Staples Center, where, as an employee of the Gary Smith Company, he served as a talent producer, and working directly with Al Gore, Hillary Clinton, Bill Clinton and Jimmy Carter.

In 2008, Allport released a duet single of David Foster's "The Prayer" with duet partner Ariana Richards.

In the summer of 2009, also directed The Bilderberg Club, a pilot that he created with collaborative partner, Julia Diana Alexander, a fictional expose of the shadow one world government.

On August 29, 2010, Allport performed his new live show "Living the Dream" at Sterling's Upstairs at Vitellos.

January – March 2011, Allport tours Italy, Poland and France with Polish soprano, Dominika Zamara, as they star together in Mystique.

May 5, 2011, Developed in Europe with noted soprano, Dominika Zamara, Allport debuted the Mystique Touring show in Los Angeles at the historic Warner Grand Theatre.  Mystique stars Allport and Zamara and features original compositions by Maria Newman, Alfred Newman as well as Emmy-award winning composers Steve and Julie Bernstein.

January 15, 2012, Allport directed the motion picture and live broadcast of the Young Musicians Foundation Gala featuring conductors Michael Tilson Thomas, Joey Newman and John Williams.

He is also an accomplished and commissioned composer, with works including "Through the Windows on a Train," a modern classical piece with arrangements for full orchestra, chamber orchestra, and piano; "Song of Solomon," an epic wedding duet; "Arise, Awake O Christmas Day," an eighth-part choral masterpiece; and "Shenandoah," an arrangement of the traditional folk song.

Filmography
Peter Pan and the Pirates (1990) TV series (Voice)
Recycle Rex (1993) (Voice)
Clueless (18 episodes, 1996–1997) (TV) (Voice)
Dawson's Creek (1 episode, 1999) (TV)
Absolutely True (2000) (TV) episodes)
Rocket Power (1 episode, 2001) (TV) (Voice)
Boston Public (1 episode, 2001) (TV)
Pirates of the Caribbean: At World's End (2007)
The Bilderberg Club: Meet the Shadow One World Government (2009) (Writer/Director/Producer)
All the Sins of the Past (2009) (Writer/Director/Producer)
Tristan und Isolde (2010) filmed live at The Broad Stage, Santa Monica, CA (Motion Picture Director / Producer)
Amahl and the Night Visitors (2010) filmed live at The Pasadena Playhouse, Pasadena, CA (Motion Picture Director / Producer)
57th Annual Young Musicians Foundation Gala (2012) filmed live at The Dorothy Chandler Pavilion, Los Angeles, CA (Motion Picture Director / Producer)
From Manzanar to the Divided States of America (2016) Documentary (Director)
Emily or Oscar (2018) Romantic Comedy (Director)

Discography
Song of Solomon (2017) classical wedding composition for orchestra, organ and two voices voice – recorded by Hollywood Chamber Orchestra (Chris M. Allport, Composer / Singer)
Oh Shenandoah (2017) classical arrangement for piano, cello, flute and voice:  — recorded by John Dickson, Leah Mezlter, Sara Andon and Chris M. Allport (Chris M. Allport, Arranger, Singer)
Arise, Awake o Christmas Day (suite) (2016) classical composition for chamber orchestra and choir  — recorded by Hollywood Chamber Orchestra (Chris M. Allport, Composer)
The Lord's Prayer (2016) classical composition for chamber orchestra and choir  — recorded by Hollywood Chamber Orchestra (Chris M. Allport, Composer)
The Prayer (2008) by David Foster, Carole Bayer Sager, Alberto Testa and Tony Renis. (Duet vocalist with Ariana Richards)

Soundtrack performances
Hook (1991)
The Mighty Ducks (1992)
D2: The Mighty Ducks (1994)
Mr. Holland's Opus (1995)
Pirates of the Caribbean: At World's End (2007)
Godzilla (2014)

Activism
Allport had been a youth representative for the Screen Actors Guild. He contributed significantly to legislation protecting the welfare, educational and financial rights of young performers and all children.

In 1999 Allport testified before legislative panels in California and New York on the need for statutory protection for child actors' earnings. He did this with Paul Petersen, founder in 1990 of A Minor Consideration, a nonprofit group devoted to protecting and advancing the interests of child actors.

In 2002 he was appointed by Melissa Gilbert, then President of the Screen Actors Guild, as the national chair of its Young Performers Committee, a joint committee with the American Federation of Television and Radio Artists, co-chaired by Paul Petersen.

Allport served as president of Paul Petersen's organization, A Minor Consideration for a two-year term.

In 2021, Allport joined the television series, Sports Stories with Denny Lennon.

Awards and nominations

 1992, Won Young Artist Award for 'Outstanding Young Voice-Over in an Animated Series or Special' for Peter Pan and the Pirates
 1994, Won Young Artist Award for 'Best performance by a Young Actor'
 1995, Won Young Artist Award for 'Best Professional Actor/Singer'
 2011, Won Park City Film Music Festival 'Gold Medal for Excellence,' 'Life is too Short to Sing Badly'

References

External links
Official website

The Bilderberg Club (film) Official website

1977 births
Living people
American male child actors
American male voice actors
Male actors from Burbank, California
Singers from California
21st-century American singers